Academia Mihăileană was an institution of higher learning based in Iași, Moldavia, and active in the first part of the 19th century. Like other Eastern European institutions of its kind, it was both a high school and a higher learning institute, housing several faculties. Academia Mihăileană was the predecessor of the Iași National College and the University of Iași.

History
Academia Mihăileană's founder is intellectual Gheorghe Asachi, who obtained the permission and support of the ruling Prince Mihail Sturdza. It derived its Mihăileană name from the monarch's first name (literally: "Michaelian Academy"). Sturdza issued the official decision which authorized the founding of the Academy in 1834. Because the institution was not assigned a building of its own, courses began at the Vasilian Gymnasium, a school founded by the same Asachi in 1828. On June 6, 1835, the academy had its official inauguration on separate premises, with the participation of Prince Sturdza. A dedication liturgy was held in the nearby Talpalari Church, which thenceforth served as the academy's chapel.

Although Academia Mihăileană no longer provided faculty courses after 1847, it was not legally abolished, and temporarily suspended its activity (during a time of political turmoil caused by the frequent Ottoman–Russian clashes on Moldavia's soil, and the periods of Russian occupation).

In 1860, Alexandru Ioan Cuza (Domnitor of the Principality of Moldavia) decided to disestablish the institution and split its patrimony. Its faculties were set up as a nucleus for the newly established University of Iași, while the inferior courses were re-created as the Iași National College (where studies lasted 7 years). Many of the academy’s professors continued their activity within the University.

Organisation
Academia Mihăileană was organized in three faculties, of Law, Philosophy and Theology, following the model of its predecessor, the Princely Academy from Iaşi (1707–1821), where Asachi had been a teacher of Applied Sciences and Engineering from 1813 to 1819. The program of study in the faculties of Philosophy and Theology lasted two years, while the Faculty of Law took three years. In order to be admitted into the Faculty of Law, one had to first graduate from Philosophy.

The Academy delivered certificates of study, but not specific academic degrees. Like present-day graduates of the French École Normale Supérieure, students who completed courses at Academia Mihăileană only received a certificate that gave them the right to work in the service of the state, in administration, justice or education. Due to the quality of the study programs and to the qualification of the professors (most of them had a PhD from Austrian or Hungarian universities and were members of various academic associations), the Western universities readily recognized the Academy's study certificates. Their possessors could enlist directly in a doctoral program, similar to graduates of any Western university in the period.

Notable faculty and alumni
 Simion Bărnuțiu (1808–1864), philosopher and jurist 
 Dimitrie Asachi (1820–1868), mathematician
 Damaschin Bojincă (1802–1869), professor, politician, historian
 Alexandru Costinescu (1812–1872), architect engineer
 Iacob Cihac (1800–1888), medical doctor, professor of natural history
 Nicolae Culianu (1832–1915), mathematician and astronomer
 Nicolae Dabija (1837–1884), general and politician
 Anastasie Fătu (1816–1886), medical doctor and naturalist, founder of the Iaşi Botanical Garden
 Christian Flechtenmacher (1785–1843), jurist, legislator, professor of Law
 Ion Ghica (1816–1897), revolutionary, politician, diplomat, writer, professor
 Dimitrie Gusti (1818–1887), writer, politician, professor
 Ion Ionescu de la Brad (1818–1891), revolutionary, agronomist, professor, scholar
 Mihail Kogălniceanu (1817–1891), politician, historian, professor 
 Gheorghe Lemeni (1813–1848), painter
 Petre Maler-Câmpeanu (1809–1893), professor of philosophy, philologist
 Eftimie Murgu (1805–1870), revolutionary, politician, professor of philosophy 
 Gheorghe Năstăseanu (1812–1864), painter
 Gheorghe Panaiteanu Bardasare (1816–1900), painter and graphician
 Petru Poni (1841–1925), chemist and mineralogist
 Elie Radu (1853–1931), civil engineer and academic
 Gheorghe Săulescu (1798–1864), philologist, poet, professor of universal history and logic
 Filaret Scriban (1811–1873), theologian, translator, professor of rhetoric, poetry and mythology
 Neofit Scriban (1808–1884), theologian, writer
 Teodor Stamati (1812–1852), physicist and mathematician
 Anton Velini (1812–1873), professor of philosophy, pedagogue
 Constantin Petrescu-Conduratu (1844–1900), typographer, printer, writer

See also
 Academia Vasiliană
 The Princely Academy
 Alexandru Ioan Cuza University
 Gheorghe Asachi Technical University

Sources

 Academia Mihaileană – Prima instituţie de învăţământ superior modern din Moldova (1835 – 1847).
 Colegiul Național - Scurt Istoric.
 Clădirea Academiei Mihăilene sub iminenţa demolării. Un memoriu ignorat.

External links
 Mihail Kogălniceanu, Cuvânt pentru deschiderea cursului de istorie națională, Iași, 1843

History of Moldavia (1822–1859)
Alexandru Ioan Cuza University
Educational institutions established in 1834
1834 establishments in Europe
1834 establishments in the Ottoman Empire
19th-century establishments in Moldavia
1860 disestablishments in Romania